The Bouchard Archeological Site, RI-1025 is a prehistoric archaeological site in South Kingstown, Rhode Island, USA.  The site, on a bluff overlooking Glen Rock Reservoir, has yielded evidence of Native American occupation from the Late Archaic to the Early Woodland periods.  The site is governed by the Farmers Home Administration.

It was listed on the National Register of Historic Places in 1984.

See also
National Register of Historic Places listings in Washington County, Rhode Island

References

Archaeological sites on the National Register of Historic Places in Rhode Island
South Kingstown, Rhode Island
National Register of Historic Places in Washington County, Rhode Island